There have been five baronetcies created for people with the surname Napier, three in the Baronetage of England, one in the Baronetage of Nova Scotia and one in the Baronetage of the United Kingdom. As of 2014 two of the creations are extant.

The Napier Baronetcy, of Luton Hoo in the County of Bedford, was created in the Baronetage of England on 24 September 1611 for Robert Napier. The title became extinct on the death of the sixth Baronet in 1748.

The Napier Baronetcy, of Merchistoun in the County of Midlothian, was created in the Baronetage of Nova Scotia on 2 March 1627 for Archibald Napier. Later that year he was raised to the Peerage of Scotland as Lord Napier. The baronetcy became dormant in 1683 on the death of the third Lord and third Baronet, while the lordship passed to the late Lord's nephew. The baronetcy was successfully claimed in 1817 by the third Lord Napier's heir male general, the eighth Baronet. The 13th Baronet settled in South Africa, where the 14th Baronet lives in Benmore Gardens.

The Napier Baronetcy, of Middle Marsh in the County of Dorset, was created in the Baronetage of England on 25 June 1641 for Gerrard Napier. The title became extinct on the death of the sixth Baronet in 1765.

The Napier Baronetcy, of Punknoll in the County of Dorset, was created in the Baronetage of England on 25 February 1682 for Robert Napier, a nephew of Sir Gerrard Napier. The title probably became extinct on the death of the second Baronet in 1743.

The Napier Baronetcy, of Merrion Square in the County of Dublin, was created in the Baronetage of the United Kingdom on 9 April 1867 for the Conservative politician and former Lord Chancellor of Ireland Joseph Napier.

Napier baronets, of Luton Hoo (1611)

Sir Robert Napier, 1st Baronet (1560–1637)
Sir Robert Napier, 2nd Baronet (–1661)
Sir Robert Napier, 3rd Baronet (died 1675)
Sir John Napier, 4th Baronet (1636–1711)
Sir Theophilus Napier, 5th Baronet (1672–1719)
Sir John Napier, 6th Baronet (died 1748)

Napier baronets, of Merchistoun (1627)

Archibald Napier, 1st Lord Napier, 1st Baronet (–1645)
Archibald Napier, 2nd Lord Napier, 2nd Baronet (c. 1625–1660)
Archibald Napier, 3rd Lord Napier, 3rd Baronet (died 1683) 
Sir Alexander Napier, de jure 4th Baronet (died 1702)
Sir John Napier, de jure 5th Baronet (1686–1735)
Sir William Napier, de jure 6th Baronet (died )
Sir Robert John Milliken-Napier, de jure 7th Baronet (1765–1808)
Sir William John Milliken-Napier, 8th Baronet (1788–1852)
Sir Robert John Milliken-Napier, 9th Baronet (1818–1884)
Sir Archibald Lennox Milliken Napier, 10th Baronet (1855–1907)
Sir Alexander Lennox Napier, 11th Baronet (1882–1954)
Sir Robert Archibald Napier, MBE, 12th Baronet (1889–1965)
Sir William Archibald Napier, 13th Baronet (1915–1990)
Sir John Archibald Lennox Napier, 14th Baronet (born 1946)

The heir apparent is the present holder's only son Hugh Robert Lennox Napier of Merchistoun, Younger of Napier (born 1977).

Napier baronets, of Middle Marsh (1641)
Sir Gerrard Napier, 1st Baronet (1606–1673)
Sir Nathaniel Napier, 2nd Baronet (–1709)
Sir Nathaniel Napier, 3rd Baronet (c. 1668–1728)
Sir William Napier, 4th Baronet (c. 1696–1753)
Sir Gerrard Napier, 5th Baronet (c. 1701–1759)
Sir Gerrard Napier, 6th Baronet (c. 1740–1765)

Napier baronets, of Punknoll (1682)
Sir Robert Napier, 1st Baronet (c. 1640–1700)
Sir Charles Napier, 2nd Baronet (–1743)

Napier baronets, of Merrion Square (1867)

Sir Joseph Napier, 1st Baronet (1804–1882)
Sir Joseph Napier, 2nd Baronet (1841–1884)
Sir William Lennox Napier, 3rd Baronet (1867–1915)
Lt-Col. Sir Joseph William Lennox Napier, OBE, 4th Baronet (1895–1986)
Sir Robert Surtees Napier, 5th Baronet (1932–1994)
Sir Charles Joseph Napier, 6th Baronet (born 1973)

See also
Lord Napier

Notes

References 
Kidd, Charles, Williamson, David (editors). Debrett's Peerage and Baronetage (1990 edition). New York: St Martin's Press, 1990, 

 

Baronetcies in the Baronetage of Nova Scotia
Baronetcies in the Baronetage of the United Kingdom
Extinct baronetcies in the Baronetage of England
 
1611 establishments in England
1627 establishments in Nova Scotia
1867 establishments in the United Kingdom